The Sitka Summer Music Festival is a month-long classical chamber music festival in Sitka, Alaska.

About
The festival takes place in early summer during the month of June with three groupings of musicians. Each group of musicians performs three concerts before a new group arrives to perform the next three concerts.

Each season of the festival consists of around ten evening concerts, the centerpieces of the festival, as well as several free, informal "brown bag" concerts and multiple fundraising events and cruises.

All of the evening concerts occur at the breathtaking venue of Harrigan Centennial Hall, in downtown Sitka. While it is not an auditorium (rather, the main hall of a convention/civic center), its glass-panel backdrop reveals a clear view of Crescent Harbor, Eastern Channel and its assortment of small, tree-covered islands dotting its water, snow-capped mountains, and an occasional bald eagle swooping down from the sky.

The organization's offices are located in Stevenson Hall on the campus of the former Sheldon Jackson College in Sitka.  Stevenson Hall is part of the National Historic Landmark District created in 2001.  The hall was built in 1911 as part of the central campus.

The festival's sheet music library is housed in Stratton Library, also on the campus of the former Sheldon Jackson College.

The artistic director is Zuill Bailey.

Other series
The festival also offers a series of Autumn and Winter Classics at Alaska Pacific University in Anchorage, where the festival's full-time office is located. During February and June the festival also offers a winter and summer touring series sending a small group of musicians (a piano quintet at most) to a number of small, usually rural communities throughout the state. The winter series visits different communities each year, Sitka notwithstanding, which always hosts the finale concert.

History
The festival began in 1972 as an informal musical reunion, organized by Paul Rosenthal, of the students of Jascha Heifetz and Gregor Piatigorsky from the University of Southern California. Their concerts were a success and the reunion became an annual festival directed by Rosenthal, growing larger throughout the years. The Autumn and Winter Classics in Anchorage were begun in 1980 and have also continued successfully since.

The festival went virtual in 2020 as officials blamed the COVID-19 pandemic as grounds for cancelling live concerts.

Musicians
While there have been 110 festival musicians since its inception in 1972, a list of the more notable musicians classified by instrument is below:

Bassoon
 Patricia Kindel

Cello
 Zuill Bailey
 Anthony Elliott
 Denise Djokic
 Godfried Hoogeveen
 Gregor Piatigorsky
 Nathaniel Rosen
 Peter Rejto
 Stephen Kates
 Toby Saks
 Jeffrey Solow

Clarinet
 Eli Eban
 Michael Webster
 Russell Harlow

Double bass
 David Brown
 Jeff Levine

Flute
 Leone Buyse
 Lorna McGhee
 Maria Piccinini
 Donna Stewart

Guitar
 Jack Sanders
 Simon Wynberg

Harp
 Nancy Allen
 Rita Costanzi

Horn
 Francis Orval
 Robert Routch

Oboe
 Allan Vogel

Piano
 Arnulf von Arnim
 Doris Stevenson
 Edward Auer
 Phillip Bush
 Jerome Lowenthal
 Sung Mi-Im
 Ursula Oppens

Viola
 Atar Arad
 David Harding
 Marcus Thompson
 Milton Thomas
 Paul Neubauer
 Rainer Moog
 Randolph Kelly
 Toby Hoffman
 Leslie Harlow

Violin
 Andres Cardenes
 Arturo Delmoni
 Charles Castleman
 Christiaan Bor
 Diane Monroe
 Gwen Thompson
 Ik-Hwan Bae
 Martin Beaver
 Paul Rosenthal
 Philippe Djokic

A full list of musicians.

References

External links
 
 Article about the festival

Music festivals established in 1972
1972 establishments in Alaska
Annual events in Alaska
Classical music festivals in the United States
Music festivals in Alaska
June events
Summer festivals
Tourist attractions in Sitka, Alaska
Chamber music festivals